István Liszkay (30 November 1912 – 29 November 2005) was a Hungarian cyclist. He competed in three events at the 1936 Summer Olympics.

References

External links
 

1912 births
2005 deaths
Hungarian male cyclists
Olympic cyclists of Hungary
Cyclists at the 1936 Summer Olympics
Cyclists from Budapest